This is a list of dune fields not on Earth which have been given official names by the International Astronomical Union. Dune fields are named according to the IAU's rules of planetary nomenclature. The relevant descriptor term is undae. As of now, the only two Solar System planets, besides Earth, with named dune fields are Venus and Mars. Dune fields have also been discovered on Saturn's moon Titan, Pluto and comet 67P/Churyumov–Gerasimenko.

Venus 
There are three officially named dune fields on Venus. They are named after desert goddesses, as per the IAU's rules. They are listed below.
 Al-Uzza Undae  67.7N, 90.5E – named after Uzza, an Arabian desert goddess
 Menat Undae 24.8S, 339.4E
 Ningal Undae  9.0N, 60.7E – named after Ningal, the wife of the Sumerian desert god Sin

Mars 

There are six officially named dune fields on Mars, which are named after nearby classical albedo features in accordance with the IAU's rules. Five of them lie between 75°N to 85°N, between Planum Boreum and Vastitas Borealis. These dune fields span over 200 degrees of longitude. The sixth, Ogygis Undae, lies on the southern hemisphere of Mars. They are listed below.
 Abalos Undae
 Aspledon Undae
 Hyperboreae Undae
 Ogygis Undae
 Olympia Undae
 Siton Undae

Unofficial field names 

 Bagnold dune field, Gale crater. This dune field was explored by Curiosity between initially between mission Sols ~1174–1248, where the rover investigated High dune, and Namib dune. Three orders of bedform were identified: wind ripple, large ripple (or wind drag ripple) and dune. Sand grains in this section of the dune field had a modal grain size of 120 μm
 Namib dune, Gale crater. This is a prominent feature that looks like the giant dunes of Africa’s Namib Desert.
 As part of the Mars Exploration Rover mission, a small dune field unofficially named El Dorado on the south side of Husband Hill in Gusev crater was investigated by the Spirit rover from sols 706 to 710. Analysis of El Dorado showed that it consists of black wind-blown sand which is "well-sorted, well-rounded and olivine rich.

 The Hagal dune field is named after Frank Herbert's novel Dune and the fictional planet Hagal.  The field is also known as the "Martian Morse Code" due to the similarity of the Dune shapes to Morse code dots and dashes.
 Nili Patera dune field

Titan 
There are five officially named dune fields on Titan, which are named after Greek gods, goddesses or personifications of wind. They are listed below:
 Aura Undae
 Boreas Undae
 Eurus Undae
 Notus Undae
 Zephyrus Undae

Literature also uses names of dark albedo features when referring to Titan's dune fields:
 Aztlan
 Belet
 Fensal
 Senkyo
 Shangri-La

Pluto 

Analysis of high resolution photos from New Horizons taken on 14 July 2015 of Pluto's Sputnik Planum region in 2018 has confirmed the presence of transverse dunes (perpendicular to the wind streaks) within the cellular nitrogen plains, spaced about 0.4 to 1 km apart, that are thought to be composed of 200-300 μm diameter particles of methane ice believed to be derived from the nearby Al-Idrisi Montes. These features are yet to be formally named.

References 

A large portion of this article was sourced from the Gazetteer of Planetary Nomenclature, the official IAU database of planetary names.

 

 
Surface features of Mars
Surface features of Venus
Dune fields